Teen Age Lust is a live album by American rock band MC5. It was recorded live at the Saginaw Civic Center in Saginaw, Michigan in January 1970. It was released in 1996 on Total Energy Records after digital remastering.

Track listing 

 "Intros/Ramblin' Rose" – 2:45
 "Human Being Lawnmower" – 2:40
 "Tonight" – 3:00
 "Rama Lama Fa Fa Fa" – 4:00
 "It's a Man's Man's Man's World" – 6:50
 "Teen Age Lust" – 2:35
 "Looking at You" – 3:40
 "Fire of Love" – 3:20
 "Shakin' Street" – 2:40
 "Starship"/"Kick Out the Jams"/"Black to Comm" – 13:00

Personnel 
 MC5

 Rob Tyner – vocals
 Wayne Kramer – guitar, vocals on track 1
 Fred Sonic Smith – guitar, vocals on track 9
 Michael Davis – bass guitar
 Dennis Thompson – drums

References

External links 

 

MC5 albums
1996 live albums